Kerala's major political parties are aligned under two coalitions, namely the Left Democratic Front (LDF) and the United Democratic Front (UDF) since the late 1970s. Kerala was the first Indian state to have coalition government as early as 1961
.

Pre-poll alliances

State-level alliances
 Left Democratic Front
 National Democratic Alliance
 United Democratic Front
People's Welfare Alliance

National-level alliances 
 National Democratic Alliance(BJP+)(NDA)
 United Progressive Alliance(INC+)(UPA)
 Left Front

National Parties

State Parties

Regional Parties

References

 
Kerala
Kerala politics-related lists